The FIC Mk. 9 is a submachine gun designed by a private venture of Floro International Corporation (FIC) based in Tanay, Rizal Province in the Philippines. The weapon is marketed to local security forces as a low-cost alternative to imported submachine guns and is currently in limited use by the Philippines Marines and the Philippines Navy.

Development
Though several Philippine enterprises are involved in the manufacture of small arms, submachine gun production is mostly limited to copies of foreign designs such as the MAC-10 and the KG-9 assembled in clandestine workshops for sale in the black market. There are few openly marketed indigenous submachine gun designs owing to the availability and popularity of imported weapons such as the Israeli Uzi and the H&K MP5.

The FIC Mk. 9 submachine gun was developed by a private venture of FIC, an ISO 9000-certified company, providing precision manufacturing and digital/optical media services. It was offered for evaluation to the Armed Forces of the Philippines and the Philippine National Police. Initial responses were favorable and some sales were made, particularly to the AFP's Anti-Crime Task Force and the Philippine Navy's Special Warfare Group. The Philippine Marine Corps had a standing requirement for submachine guns, such as the FIC MK. 9, to serve as personal defense weapons for armor crews. Limited funds and the availability of M3 Grease Guns from reserve weapon stockpiles caused the M3 to be issued instead, favored due to its use of the .45 ACP cartridge, considered better due to its wider use and greater stopping power.

Design details
The standard Mk. 9 is a blowback-operated weapon chambered for the 9x19 mm Parabellum cartridge. It fires from a closed bolt with a selector switch allowing semi-automatic or full-automatic fire. There is no bolt-locking mechanism. The upper receiver is a steel tube and the barrel is held in place by the perforated barrel jacket. The lower receiver and magazine housing consist of sheet metal. The long magazine well has a plastic hand guard and doubles as a forward grip. It has the Uzi submachine gun-type magazine interface and uses Uzi magazines which are locally available. The folding metal butt is based on the Uzi pattern as well.  The Mk. 9 uses the firing mechanism of the M16, the standard service rifle in the AFP.

The external appearance of the gun shows a striking resemblance to the Federal Engineering XC series of semi-automatic "assault rifle lookalike" carbines (marked 220, 450 and 900; in .22LR, .45 ACP and 9mm Para calibers respectively) produced in the mid-1980s in the US; approximately 20 years before the emergence of the FIC MK 9 on the market.

A comparison of the two guns suggests the makers of FIC MK-9 studied the XC 900 carbine and based their design directly on it, although with some slight differences, add-ons, and modifications that in some way improved the original design.
One such improvement is usage of the Uzi magazine style catch in FIC magwell, rather than making modified Uzi magazines with welded steel insert at the top of the magazine, serving the purpose of catch retainer surface, as in the original XC 900. This decision to bind the users of the gun in buying only the company's spare parts created logistics problems as it disabled the compatibility in using that particular magazine directly in the Uzi (which cannot be put in the magwell due to the steel insert), or buying the standard 25 or 32-round Uzi magazine on the surplus market to be used as a spare one for XC 900 carbine. Another usable add-on to the design is the Picatinny rail, allowing to easily mount scopes and other equipment, which was in the original XC troublesome. The sights are also different, as the original ones were not user-friednly when attempting to zero them.

The cocking handle is on the left side of the upper receiver and incorporated with a dust cover. The front sights are fixed and rear sights have an adjustment knob for windage. The upper receiver has a Picatinny rail installed allowing telescopic and red dot sights to be used.

Variants
The MP-9 is a shortened version with a skeletal wire stock and no barrel jacket. Both the Mk.9 and the MP-9 are available in semi/full automatic versions.

Users

Philippine Navy
Philippine Marines

Republic of China Armed Forces (Special Forces)

References

 
 
 

Firearms articles needing expert attention
9mm Parabellum submachine guns
Submachine guns of the Philippines